Owmandan (also Romanized as Owmandān, Umandan, and Ūmandān; also known as Ma‘āf-e Omandān and Omandān) is a village in Taher Gurab Rural District, in the Central District of Sowme'eh Sara County, Gilan Province, Iran. At the 2006 census, its population was 345, in 113 families.

References 

Populated places in Sowme'eh Sara County